Amblypterus (from  , 'blunt' and   'wing' or 'fin') is an extinct genus of ray-finned fish.

See also
 List of prehistoric bony fish

References 

 Dietze, K., 2000. A Revision Of Paramblypterid And Amblypterid Actinopterygians From Upper Carboniferous-Lower Permian Lacustrine Deposits Of Central Europe. Palaeontology 43, 927–966.
Evolution: The Grand Experiment by Carl Werner and Debbie Werner
Fishes of the World by Joseph S. Nelson
A Pictorial Guide to Fossils by Gerard Ramon Case

Prehistoric ray-finned fish genera
Permian bony fish
Permian fish of Asia
Permian fish of Europe
Taxa named by Louis Agassiz